Gradiška, formerly Bosanska Gradiška, is a city and municipality located in the northwestern region of Republika Srpska, the entity of Bosnia and Herzegovina. As of 2013, it has a population of 51,727 inhabitants, while the city of Gradiška has a population of 14,368 inhabitants.

History
In the Roman period this town was of strategic importance; a port of the Roman fleet was situated here. Among notable archaeological findings are a viaduct.

Gradiški Brod is mentioned for the first time as a town in  1330. It had a major importance as the location where the Sava river used to be crossed. By 1537, the town and its surroundings came under Ottoman rule.

The Ottoman built a fortress, which served as the Bosnia Eyalet's northern defense line. The town was also called Berbir because of the fortress.

Following the outbreak of the First Serbian Uprising (1804), in the Sanjak of Smederevo (modern Central Serbia), the  Jančić's Revolt broke out in the Gradiška region against the Ottoman government in the Bosnia Eyalet, following the erosion of the economic, national and religious rights of Serbs. Hajduks also arrived from Serbia, and were especially active on the Kozara. Jovan Jančić Sarajlija organized the uprising with help from Metropolitan Benedikt Kraljević. The peasants took up arms on 23 September 1809, in the region of Gradiška, beginning from Mašići. The fighting began on 25 September, and on the same night, the Ottomans captured and executed Jančić. The rebels retreated to their villages, except those in Kozara and Motajica who continued, and offered strong resistance until their defeat in mid-October, after extensive looting and burning of villages by the Ottomans. Another revolt broke out in 1834, in Mašići.

Ottoman rule ended with the Austro-Hungarian occupation of Bosnia and Herzegovina (1878), following the Herzegovina Uprising (1875–77). Austro-Hungarian rule in Bosnia and Herzegovina ended in 1918, when the South Slavic Austro-Hungarian territories proclaimed the State of Slovenes, Croats and Serbs, which subsequently joined the Kingdom of Serbia into the Kingdom of Yugoslavia.

From 1929 to 1941 Gradiška was part of the Vrbas Banovina of the Kingdom of Yugoslavia.

During Yugoslavia, the town was known as Bosanska Gradiška (Босанска Градишка). During the Bosnian War, the town was incorporated into Republika Srpska. After the war, the RS National Assembly changed the name, omitting bosanska ("Bosnian"), as was done with many other towns (Kostajnica, Dubica, Novi Grad, Petrovo, Šamac).

Settlements
Aside from the town of Gradiška, the municipality includes total of 74 other settlements:

 Adžići
 Baraji
 Berek
 Bistrica
 Bok Jankovac
 Brestovčina
 Bukovac
 Bukvik
 Cerovljani
 Cimiroti
 Čatrnja
 Čelinovac
 Čikule
 Donja Dolina
 Donja Jurkovica
 Donji Karajzovci
 Donji Podgradci
 Dragelji
 Dubrave
 Dušanovo
 Elezagići
 Gašnica
 Gornja Dolina
 Gornja Jurkovica
 Gornja Lipovača

 Gornji Karajzovci
 Gornji Podgradci
 Grbavci
 Greda
 Jablanica
 Jazovac
 Jelići
 Kijevci
 Kočićevo
 Kozara
 Kozinci
 Krajčinovci
 Krajišnik
 Kruškik
 Laminci Brezici
 Laminci Dubrave
 Laminci Jaružani
 Laminci Sređani
 Liskovac
 Lužani
 Mačkovac
 Mašići
 Mičije
 Miloševo Brdo

 Miljevići
 Mokrice
 Nova Topola
 Novo Selo
 Orahova
 Orubica
 Petrovo Selo
 Rogolji
 Romanovci
 Rovine
 Samardžije
 Seferovci
 Sovjak
 Srednja Jurkovica
 Šaškinovci
 Šimići
 Trebovljani
 Trnovac
 Trošelji
 Turjak
 Uzari
 Vakuf
 Vilusi
 Vrbaška
 Žeravica

Demographics

Population

Ethnic composition

Culture

The town has a Serbian Orthodox cathedral dedicated to the Mother of God. There is also a mosque called the Džamija Begluk.

Sports
Local football club Kozara have played in the top tier of the Bosnia and Herzegovina football pyramid but spent most seasons in the country's second level First League of the Republika Srpska.

Economy
The following table gives a preview of total number of registered people employed in legal entities per their core activity (as of 2018):

Notable residents
 Marko Marin, German footballer
 Zvjezdan Misimović, Bosnian footballer 
 Vaso Čubrilović, politician and historian, member of Black Hand organisation and participant in the conspiracy to kill Archduke Franz Ferdinand of Austria.
 Veljko Čubrilović, member of Black Hand organisation
 Vlado Jagodić, former footballer, now manager
 Vinko Marinović, former Serbian footballer, now manager
 Tatjana Pašalić, poker presenter
 Nordin Gerzić, Swedish footballer
 Alojzije Mišić, Roman Catholic bishop
 Branko Grahovac, football goalkeeper
 Atif Dudaković, Bosnian war-time army general
 Nazif Hajdarović, footballer
 Ratko Varda, basketball player
 Milan Janković, footballer
 Miodrag Latinović, retired footballer
 Zlatko Janjić, footballer
 Ozren Perić, footballer
 Safet Halilović, politician
 Ognjen Ožegović, Serbian footballer, European U-19 champion
 Goran Zakarić, Bosnian footballer

International relations

Twin towns and sister cities

Gradiška is twinned with:

 Kavala, Greece (1994)
 Ćuprija, Serbia (1994)
 Negotino, North Macedonia (2006)
 Montesilvano, Italy (2018)
 Palilula, Serbia (2019)
 Zubin Potok, Kosovo (2021)

Partnerships
Gradiška also cooperates with:

 Banja Luka, Bosnia and Herzegovina (2016)
 Bihać, Bosnia and Herzegovina (2016)
 Bijeljina, Bosnia and Herzegovina (2016)
 Bosanska Krupa, Bosnia and Herzegovina (2016)
 Cazin, Bosnia and Herzegovina (2016)
 Čelinac, Bosnia and Herzegovina (2016)
 Doboj, Bosnia and Herzegovina (2016)
 Kozarska Dubica, Bosnia and Herzegovina (2016)
 Foča, Bosnia and Herzegovina (2016)
 Goražde, Bosnia and Herzegovina (2016)
 Gračanica, Bosnia and Herzegovina (2016)
 Gradačac, Bosnia and Herzegovina (2016)
 Kalesija, Bosnia and Herzegovina (2016)
 Konjic, Bosnia and Herzegovina (2016)
 Maglaj, Bosnia and Herzegovina (2016)
 Modriča, Bosnia and Herzegovina (2016)
 Mostar, Bosnia and Herzegovina (2016)
 Novi Grad, Bosnia and Herzegovina (2016)
 Odžak, Bosnia and Herzegovina (2016)
 Orašje, Bosnia and Herzegovina (2016)
 Prijedor, Bosnia and Herzegovina (2016)
 Prnjavor, Bosnia and Herzegovina (2016)
 Sanski Most, Bosnia and Herzegovina (2016)
 Srebrenik, Bosnia and Herzegovina (2016)
 Šamac, Bosnia and Herzegovina (2016)
 Teslić, Bosnia and Herzegovina (2016)
 Tešanj, Bosnia and Herzegovina (2016)
 Tuzla, Bosnia and Herzegovina (2016)
 Vareš, Bosnia and Herzegovina (2016)
 Velika Kladuša, Bosnia and Herzegovina (2016)
 Žepče, Bosnia and Herzegovina (2016)
 Živinice, Bosnia and Herzegovina (2016)
 Laktaši, Bosnia and Herzegovina (2018)
 Čačak, Serbia (2018)
 Herceg Novi, Montenegro (2018)
 Hersonissos, Greece (2018)
 Labin, Croatia (2018)
 Nova Gorica, Slovenia (2018)
 Ragusa, Italia (2018)
 Shkodër, Albania (2018)
 Tiranë, Albania (2018)
 Daruvar, Croatia (2020)
 Lipik, Croatia (2020)
 Jesi, Italia (2020)
 Marche, Italia (2020)
 Mošćenička Draga, Croatia (2020)
 Kotor, Montenegro (2020)
 Tepelenë, Albania (2020)

Notes

See also
Municipalities of Republika Srpska
Subdivisions of Bosnia and Herzegovina

References

External links

 

 
Populated places in Gradiška, Bosnia and Herzegovina
Bosnia and Herzegovina–Croatia border crossings